George Buckstaff may refer to:
 George H. Buckstaff, Canadian American immigrant, lumberman, and politician in Wisconsin
 George A. Buckstaff, his nephew, American lawyer, businessman, and politician in Wisconsin